Dighinala Cantonment is a cantonment in Dighinala, outside of Khagrachari. 24th Infantry Division of Bangladesh Army inhabit here.

It is one of five cantonment in Chittagong Hill Tracts area.

See also 
 Alikadam Cantonment
 Bandarban Cantonment

References

Cantonments of Bangladesh